Tufan Kelleci (born 24 October 1993) is a Turkish footballer who plays as a defender for Sivas Belediyespor. He made his Süper Lig debut on 19 January 2013.

Career

Elazığspor
On the last day of the January transfermarket 2019, Kelleci was one of 22 players on two hours, that signed for Turkish club Elazığspor. had been placed under a transfer embargo but managed to negotiate it with the Turkish FA, leading to them going on a mad spree of signing and registering a load of players despite not even having a permanent manager in place. In just two hours, they managed to snap up a record 22 players - 12 coming in on permanent contracts and a further 10 joining on loan deals until the end of the season.

References

External links
 
 
 
 

1993 births
People from Şahinbey
Living people
Turkish footballers
Turkey youth international footballers
Association football defenders
Association football fullbacks
Offenburger FV players
Gaziantepspor footballers
Altay S.K. footballers
Manisa FK footballers
Adana Demirspor footballers
Sakaryaspor footballers
Gümüşhanespor footballers
Elazığspor footballers
Tarsus Idman Yurdu footballers
Süper Lig players
TFF First League players
TFF Second League players
TFF Third League players
Turkish expatriate footballers
Expatriate footballers in Germany
Turkish expatriate sportspeople in Germany